Erik Cais (born 5 August 1999) is a Czech rally driver born in Zlín, Czech Republic. His father is the former cyclist Miroslav Cais. Erik Cais is a current driver of the Yacco ACCR Team belonging to the Autoclub of the Czech Republic, his current co-driver is Jindřiška Žáková, who has navigated Martin Vlček in the past. Before his time in motorsport, Cais was a downhill bike racer alongside another rally driver, Frenchman Nicolas Vouilloz. His rally debut came in an Opel Adam Cup in 2018 before quickly moving to a Peugeot 208 R2 in the Czech championship. In the following year he competed in the FIA European Rally Championship (ERC) behind the wheel of a Ford Fiesta R2T19. Since the 2019 Rallye du Var, his car has been the Ford Fiesta Rally2.

Biography
In 2019, Cais received the 1st TALENT OF THE YEAR FIA CEZ award from FIA President Jean Todt. He also became the runner up in ERC3.

In 2020, the British motoring weekly Motorsport News named him one of the current TOP 10 world rally talents (who do not yet drive in the WRC premier class). He challenged in ERC in the main class that year, finishing 11th in the championship and 5th in the junior category.

In 2021 he improved in ERC, finishing 6th in the championship. At his home rally of Barum Czech Rally Zlín he nearly earned his first ERC win, though he crashed on the final stage and was forced to retire after dominating the final day's stages. He appeared at the Auto UH Rallysprint Kopná race, where he won first place on almost home soil. He also shone at the Austrian Rally Weiz, from which he took second place. Another victory was not long in coming and at the Rally Poland Rajd Rzeszowski he finished in first place.

Cais also made his World Rally Championship debut in 2021 at the Rally Catalunya, finishing 3rd in the WRC2 class. In December 2021 he announced he will compete in the WRC2 Championship in 2022.

Career results

WRC results 

* Season still in progress.

WRC-2 results 

* Season still in progress.

ERC results 

* Season still in progress.

References

External links 
 Profile page at eWRC-results.com
 Profile page at FIAERC.com 

1999 births
Living people
Czech rally drivers
European Rally Championship drivers
Sportspeople from Zlín
World Rally Championship drivers